Ugor is a rural locality (a village) in Vorshinskoye Rural Settlement, Sobinsky District, Vladimir Oblast, Russia. The population was 221 as of 2010. There are 5 streets.

Geography 
Ugor is located on the Koloksha River, 16 km northeast of Sobinka (the district's administrative centre) by road. Khryastovo is the nearest rural locality.

References 

Rural localities in Sobinsky District